Freddie Palmer was a French-based jockey who won Classic races in England, Ireland and France. He was born on 15 December 1921 and became "a huge name" in flat racing in the 1950s.

He won his first major race in 1950 - the Eclipse Stakes on Flocon. His biggest successes came in 1955, when he rode Phil Drake to win the English Derby and Rapace to win the French version in the same season. The following year he won the Oaks with Sicarelle and the St Leger on Cambremer. Then in 1957, he won the King George VI and Queen Elizabeth Stakes on Montaval. He ended the 1950s with another big success on Wallaby in the 1959 Ascot Gold Cup. Among other French successes, he won the Grand Prix de Paris three times and the Prix Royal-Oak four times.

In 1962, he won a second Gold Cup on Balto, as well as a second Prix du Jockey Club on Val de Loir. He began a training career in 1964 and won two French classics - Fine Pearl in the Prix de Diane in 1966 and Le Chouan in the Prix Royal-Oak in 1969. His training career lasted until 1990, during which time he supported the careers of Jean-Claude Rouget, Patrick Monfort and Christian Scandella.

He died, aged 98, in 2020.

Major wins (as jockey)
 Great Britain
 Derby Stakes - Phil Drake (1955)
 Oaks Stakes - Sicarelle (1956)
 St Leger Stakes - Cambremer (1956)
 Ascot Gold Cup - (2) - Wallaby (1959), Balto (1962)
 Eclipse Stakes - (2) - Flocon (1950), Javelot (1960)
 King George VI and Queen Elizabeth Stakes - Montaval (1957)

 Ireland
 Irish 1,000 Guineas - Gazpacho (1963)

 France
 Prix du Jockey Club - (2) - Rapace (1955), Val de Loir (1962)
 Prix Royal-Oak - (4)
 Grand Prix de Paris - (3)

Major wins (as trainer)
 France
 Prix de Diane - Fine Pearl (1966)
 Prix Royal-Oak - Le Chouan (1969)

See also
List of jockeys

References

1921 births
2020 deaths
Jockeys